Sukhvor-e Rashid-e Olya (also Romanized as Sūkhvor-e Rashīd-e ‘Olyā, Sūkhūr-e Rashīd-e ‘Olyā, and Sūkhvor Rashīd-e ‘Olyā) is a village in Heydariyeh Rural District, Govar District, Gilan-e Gharb County, Kermanshah Province, Iran. At the 2006 census, its population was 194, in 40 families.

References 

Populated places in Gilan-e Gharb County